Joe Mays may refer to:

Joe Mays (pitcher) (born 1975), former Major League Baseball right-handed pitcher
Joe Mays (catcher) (1914–1986), American Negro league catcher
Joe Mays (American football) (born 1985), former American football linebacker